Tabloid television, also known as teletabloid, is a form of tabloid journalism. Tabloid television news broadcasting usually incorporate flashy graphics and sensationalized stories. Often, there is a heavy emphasis on crime and celebrity news.

Global perspective
The United States is not the only media market with this genre of broadcasting. Australia, New Zealand, United Kingdom and France all have tabloid television show that reflects this same down-market, sensationalist style of journalism and entertainment. People such as Rupert Murdoch also came out of this genre.

In his book Tabloid Television, John Langer argues that this type of "other news" is as equally important as the "hard news".

Examples of tabloid television
Popular shows of this type includes Hard Copy and A Current Affair.

A commonly cited example of tabloid television run amok is a series of reports in 2001 collectively dubbed the Summer of the Shark, focusing on a supposed epidemic of shark attacks after one highly publicized attack on an 8-year-old boy. In reality, there were fewer than average shark attacks that year.

Other examples include the coverage of 'missing white woman syndrome' stories like those of Chandra Levy, Elizabeth Smart, and Laci Peterson. Critics claim that news executives are boosting ratings with these stories, which only affect a select few people, instead of broadcasting national issues.

See also
Shock value
Trial by Media-2020 series about notable media-covered true crime stories 
Low culture

References

Further reading
 Potter, Deborah (October/November 2003). A Story for All Seasons - American Journalism Review. Found at NewsLab.org (July 16, 2005).
 
 
 Kearns, Burt (October 1999) Tabloid Baby

Broadcast journalism
Criticism of journalism
Television terminology
Television genres